Loose Nut is the fifth studio album by American band Black Flag, released in 1985 on SST Records.

Track listing

Personnel
Henry Rollins – lead vocals
Greg Ginn – guitars
Kira Roessler – bass, backing vocals
Bill Stevenson – drums
Raymond Pettibon – artwork
Milo Aukerman – backing vocals on "Loose Nut"

References

Black Flag (band) albums
1985 albums
SST Records albums
Albums produced by Bill Stevenson (musician)